The 1929–30 Rugby Football League season was the 35th season of rugby league football.

Season summary

Huddersfield won their fifth Championship, and their second in successive years, when they defeated Leeds 10–0 in the play–off final replay following a 2–2 draw.

St. Helens had finished the regular season as league leaders.

The Challenge Cup Winners were Widnes after beating St. Helens 10–3 in the final.

St. Helens won the Lancashire League, and Huddersfield won the Yorkshire League. Warrington beat Salford 15–2 to win the Lancashire Cup, and Hull Kingston Rovers beat Hunslet 13–7 to win the Yorkshire County Cup.

Championship

Championship play-off

Challenge Cup

Widnes beat St Helens 10–3 in the Challenge Cup Final at Wembley played before a crowd of 36,544.

This was Widnes' first Cup Final appearance and thus their first Cup Final win.

References

Sources
1929–30 Rugby Football League season at wigan.rlfans.com
The Challenge Cup at The Rugby Football League website

1929 in English rugby league
1930 in English rugby league
Northern Rugby Football League seasons